Robert William "Bob" Dann (28 September 1914 – 10 April 2008) was the 9th Anglican Archbishop of Melbourne.

Dann studied for ordination at Trinity College at the University of Melbourne and was ordained in 1946. His first post was as Director of Youth and Religious Education in the Anglican Diocese of Melbourne. After successive incumbencies he was appointed the Archdeacon of Essendon and, in 1969, he became a bishop coadjutor of the diocese before becoming the archbishop eight years later. He retired in 1983.  He came out of retirement for some months in 1987 to take charge of the parish of St John's, Camberwell, after the sudden death on the vicar, until a new appointment could be made.

He died on 10 April 2008, aged 93.

Notes

1914 births
2008 deaths
University of Melbourne alumni
People educated at Trinity College (University of Melbourne)
Anglican archdeacons in Australia
20th-century Anglican archbishops
Anglican archbishops of Melbourne
Assistant bishops in the Anglican Diocese of Melbourne